Bruno Casanova (born 1 June 1964 in Cervia) is a former Italian Grand Prix motorcycle road racer. His best year was in 1987 when he finished second to Fausto Gresini in the 125cc world championship. Casanova won one Grand Prix race during his career.

References 

1964 births
Sportspeople from the Province of Ravenna
Living people
Italian motorcycle racers
125cc World Championship riders
250cc World Championship riders